Pedro de Orrente (April 1580, Murcia – 19 January 1645, Valencia) was a Spanish painter of the early Baroque period who became one of the first artists in that part of Spain to paint in a Naturalistic style.

Biography

His father, Jaime de Horrente, was a merchant from Marseilles who had settled in Murcia in 1573. There is some documentary evidence that he was the friend of an otherwise unknown painter named  Juan de Arizmendi, who probably gave Pedro his first lessons. By 1600, Pedro was in Toledo, where he was hired to create an altarpiece in the village of Guadarrama. It has not been preserved.

He attracted little more attention until 1604, when a certain Jerónimo de Castro wrote a promise to pay Pedro's father for work that Pedro had recently done. After that time, he may have been in Italy until 1607, when he was back in Murcia arranging for the services of a maid. Letters from a later period indicate that he and Angelo Nardi may have become friends while he was there. He was married in Murcia in 1612.

By 1616, he was in Valencia, where he painted the monumental "Martyrdom of San Sebastián" at the cathedral. A year later, he was doing similar works at Toledo Cathedral. In the midst of these moves, he stopped in Cuenca and may have taken on Cristóbal García Salmerón as a student.

This was his only officially documented student. While there, he also befriended Jorge Manuel Theotocópuli, the son of El Greco, and became godfather for two of his children. Works he produced during that period include decorations at the Franciscan convent in Yeste and at the Buen Retiro Palace.

He was apparently in Toledo until 1632. By 1638, he had bought two houses in Murcia. Only one year later, he had moved away again, leaving an altarpiece unfinished. The next available piece of documentary evidence is a will that he made in Valencia in 1645, when he was widowed and childless and very comfortable, financially. He died only two days later.

Several artists were profoundly influenced by his style, including Esteban March, Pablo Pontons and Mateo Gilarte.

Selected works
La vuelta al aprisco, oil on panel (74x89 cm), Museo del Prado, Madrid
Martyrdom of Saint James the Lesser, oil on panel (204x158 cm), Museo de Bellas Artes, Valencia
Saint John the Evangelist in Patmos, oil on panel (99x131 cm), Museo del Prado
Saint John the Baptist in the Desert, oil on panel (142x107 cm), Museo de Santa Cruz, Toledo
Self-Portrait, oil on panel (45 x 36 cm), private collection, Madrid, formerly in the collection of Louis-Philippe of Orleans
Labán da alcance a Jacob, Museo del Prado, Madrid
Ecce Homo,Walters Art Museum,Baltimore

References

Antonio Palomino, An account of the lives and works of the most eminent Spanish painters, sculptors and architects, 1724, first English translation, 1739, p. 34

External links

Pedro Orrente on Artcyclopedia
 Pedro Orrente at the Museo del Prado Online Encyclopedia 
 Pedro Orrente C. by Castro Sanz. 
 Digital works by Pedro de Orrente at the Biblioteca Digital Hispánica at the National Library of Spain 

1580 births
1645 deaths
People from the Province of Albacete
16th-century Spanish painters
Spanish male painters
17th-century Spanish painters
Spanish Baroque painters